Satra Corporation was a US trading and metal processing company. It is primarily known in the United Kingdom for its Satra Motors Limited subsidiary, which was the official importer and distributor of Soviet Union cars and motorcycles in that country from 1973 to 1979. Satra is an acronym for "Soviet American Trade Association".

Subsidiaries
Satra Motors imported, modified, and distributed Soviet cars, such as Lada and  Moskvich, and motorcycles made by Ural, Dnepr, Voskhod, Minsk, and the IZh whose Planeta and Jupiter were marketed. The motorcycles were sold in Britain and Australia under a single brand name, Cossack.

Satra Motors was based in Carnaby, Bridlington, East Riding of Yorkshire on the old airfield.

Cossack motorcycles

The term Cossack Motorcycle can apply to any number of motorcycles, made in the former Soviet Union, a reference to the horseback riding Cossacks. Some are derived from the design of the 1938 BMW R71 sidecar motorcycle. Examples include the Russian Ural or the Ukrainian Dnipro.

Cossack was also the brand name applied to all Soviet motorcycles distributed by Satra Belarus from 1973 to 1979, originally located in Surrey, southern England, later moving to Carnaby in eastern England and being used by the Australian importer, Capitol Motors until May 1976 when their motorcycle division closed. 

Ural, Dnipro, IZh, Voskhod and Minsk were some of the former Soviet Union manufacturers whose bikes were imported and rebadged.

Citations

General and cited references

External links
 https://web.archive.org/web/20060929034012/http://www.cossackownersclub.co.uk/cossack_tradenamed_bikes.pdf
 http://www.cossackmotorcycles.com/index.html

Auto dealerships of the United Kingdom
AvtoVAZ
Companies of the Soviet Union
Defunct companies based in New York City
Foreign trade of the Soviet Union
Motorcycles by brand
Soviet Union–United Kingdom relations